Una paliza en el estado Sarría (English: A fight in the Sarría stadium) is a Venezuelan slapstick comedy film created by and starring Carlos Ruiz Chapellín and Ricardo Rouffet. It was first played in the Circo Metropolitano de Caracas on 26 November 1897.

Background

Ruiz was a showman by trade, and had got into the business of showing films. A variety show he was putting on at the Circo Metropolitano included film as well as zarzuelas and circus acts; in 1897, after the release of the first Venezuelan films in Maracaibo, Ruiz went into business with Ricardo Rouffet to create their own films. One of the people he employed to show films at the Circo was Gabriel Veyre; Veyre's Cinematograph  may have been used to make Ruiz' films.

Azuaga García describes Ruiz' choice to hold film showings in a circus as "gaudy", as the previous screenings were held in spectacular theatres and halls, but also suggests it was Ruiz' attempt to "truly bring cinema to the popular classes".

Film screening and content
In November 1897, advertisements in Caracas start promoting "the new Projectoscope", claiming it played in color, and "criollo views", referring to the pair of films made by Venezuelans Ruiz and Rouffet. They also claimed that they would be the first Venezuelan-made films to play in the capital.

Una paliza... was shown before its pair, Carlos Ruiz peleado..., but less is known of it. The "estado Sarría" of the title refers to a location in La Candelaria, Caracas, a neighborhood nicknamed this after a hippodrome in the area that was demolished in 1896, itself named for landowner Julio F. Sarría. The films may have been advertised to the French as showing "real things" from life in the Caracas area.

Discussing the director of the pair of films, Sueiro Villanueva proposes that it could have been Rouffet or someone else altogether, acting as director but staying absent from the public screenings. She also discusses how in Venezuela at the time, the arts were housed in social spaces exclusive to the upper classes that participated in them, specifically mentioning the estado Sarría as an area that was derided; Ruiz attempted to change this, by screening in a lower-class space, and by presenting the areas and issues relevant to its occupants' lives in this film.

Details on neither Rouffet nor the films were published in the local press, suggesting that it was critically overlooked.

References

Sources
Literature

Web

Venezuelan black-and-white films
1897 comedy films
1897 films
1890s short documentary films
Venezuelan short documentary films
Venezuelan silent short films
Venezuelan comedy films
Comedy short films
Silent comedy films